Neale Richmond (born 15 March 1983) is an Irish Fine Gael politician who has served as Minister of State since 2023. He has been a Teachta Dála (TD) for the Dublin Rathdown constituency since the 2020 general election. He previously served as a Senator for the Labour Panel from 2016 to 2020.

Education
A native of Ballinteer, Richmond was educated at Taney Parish Primary School and Wesley College, before graduating from University College Dublin, with a BA in History in 2004 and an MA in Political Science in 2005. He lives in Stepaside with his wife and family. He is a member of the Church of Ireland.

Political career
While studying in UCD, Richmond was chair of the UCD branch of Young Fine Gael.

He was elected to Dún Laoghaire–Rathdown County Council in 2009 to represent the Glencullen–Sandyford local electoral area. Richmond was re-elected to the Council in 2014 on the first count. Following his re-election to the council, he was appointed by the Taoiseach as one of Ireland's nine delegates to the European Committee of the Regions. 

He was elected to Seanad Éireann in 2016 for the Labour Panel. He was appointed Chair of the Seanad Select Committee on the decision of the United Kingdom to leave the European Union on 23 February 2017.

Following the 2020 general election, Richmond was elected to Dáil Éireann as a Fine Gael TD for the Dublin Rathdown constituency, taking the second seat in the three-seat constituency behind Catherine Martin and ahead of party colleague Josepha Madigan.

He has previously worked as an advisor in the European Parliament and Dáil Éireann, as well as a Projects Manager in the not-for-profit sector.

On 13 January 2023, he was appointed as Minister of State at the Department of Enterprise, Trade and Employment and Minister of State at the Department of Social Protection following the resignation of Damien English.

Political views 
Richmond is a strong advocate of the European Union and Ireland's interests in it. He is an outspoken critic of Brexit. He was a columnist at Slugger O'Toole. Richmond has expressed his opposition to Irish neutrality, describing it as "morally degenerate". 

He stated his initial disinterest in, but ultimate support for, the issue of same-sex marriage. Richmond supported the referendum to repeal the Eighth Amendment. 

He has been strongly critical of Sinn Féin and the Provisional IRA. He is in favour of the Republic of Ireland rejoining the Commonwealth in the context of a United Ireland.

Richmond wears the Irish branch of the Royal British Legion's "shamrock remembrance poppy" to commemorate 200,000 Irish soldiers who fought and 35,000 Irish soldiers who died in World War I. Richmond has stated that he believes the Easter lily "has become offensive". Richmond has attended July 12th celebrations marking the Battle of the Boyne and has had meetings with the Orange Order, which his grandfather was a member of.

References

External links
Neale Richmond's page on the Fine Gael website

1983 births
Living people
Fine Gael senators
Members of the 25th Seanad
Politicians from County Dublin
People educated at Wesley College, Dublin
Alumni of University College Dublin
Local councillors in Dún Laoghaire–Rathdown
Irish Anglicans
Members of the 33rd Dáil
Ministers of State of the 33rd Dáil